William Hockmore (1 November 1581 – 10 October 1626) of Buckland Baron in the parish of Combe-in-Teignhead, Devon, England, was a lawyer who served twice as a 
Member of Parliament for St Mawes in Cornwall, in 1621 and 1624.

Origins
Hockmore was the son and heir of John Hockmore of Buckland Baron by his wife Mary Floyer, a daughter of William Floyer of Floyer Hayes in the parish of St Thomas on the southern side of the City of Exeter in Devon.

Career
He matriculated at Corpus Christi College, Oxford on 23 July 1596, aged 14 and was called to the bar at the Middle Temple in 1610.  In 1621 he was elected a Member of Parliament for St Mawes in Cornwall and was re-elected in 1624 for the Happy Parliament.

Marriage and children
He married Jane Michell, a daughter and co-heiress of Sir Bartholomew Michell of Cannington, Somerset, by whom he had 3 sons and 2 daughters.

Death
Hockmore died in 1626 at the age of 44. His monument survives in Combe-in-Teignhead Church.

References

1581 births
1626 deaths
Alumni of Corpus Christi College, Oxford
Members of the Middle Temple
Members of the pre-1707 English Parliament for constituencies in Cornwall
English MPs 1621–1622
English MPs 1624–1625
English lawyers